Loboykovo is a rural locality (a selo) and the administrative center of Loboykovskoye Rural Settlement, Danilovsky District, Volgograd Oblast, Russia. The population was 825 as of 2010. There are 19 streets.

Geography 
Loboykovo is located in steppe, on the Chyornaya River, 28 km northeast of Danilovka (the district's administrative centre) by road. Kamennochernovsky is the nearest rural locality.

References 

Rural localities in Danilovsky District, Volgograd Oblast